Gotsiridze is a station on the Akhmeteli–Varketili Line of the Tbilisi Metro. It opened on 11 January 1966. It was formerly known as Elektrodepo  ( "(central) electric railway depot"). It was renamed after engineer Viktor Gotsiridze in 2011.

The station closed for repair and reconstruction work in February 2021. On March 18, 2023, the station has opened again.

External links
 Electrodepo station page at Tbilisi Municipal Portal

Tbilisi Metro stations
Railway stations opened in 1966
1966 establishments in Georgia (country)